Antoinette Azolakov (born 1944) is an American author.

In 1989, Skiptrace won the Lambda Literary Award for Lesbian Mystery. The following year, her novel The Contactees Die Young was a finalist for the same award.

Biography 
Azolakov was born in 1944 in Lufkin, Texas.  She currently lives in Austin, Texas.

Aside from writing, Azolakov has "taught high school English and Latin, worked in an explosives plant, as a welder, as a gas station attendant, as a landscape gardener and as a pet sitter."

Publications 

 Cass and the Stone Butch (1987)
 Skiptrace (1988)
 The Contactees Die Young (1989)
 Blood Lavender (1993)
 Ghostly Voices: Thirteen Texas Ghosts (2010)

References 

Living people
1944 births
Lambda Literary Award winners
Writers from Austin, Texas
People from Lufkin, Texas
Novelists from Texas
20th-century American novelists
20th-century American women writers